Spaghetti House is a 1982 Italian comedy film directed by Giulio Paradisi. It is loosely based on the Spaghetti House siege that occurred in 1975.

Plot 
In an attempted armed robbery of an Italian restaurant in London, the staff members are taken hostage by three gunmen. The police besiege the building, but in the meantime an  unexpected solidarity among hostages and criminals is born.

Cast 

 Nino Manfredi as Domenico Ceccacci
 Rudolph Walker as  Commander Martin 
 Rita Tushingham as  Kathy Ceccacci
 Leo Gullotta as  Salvatore Manzilla
 Néstor Garay as  Biagio Cerioni
 Gino Pernice as  Valentino Cottai
 Derek Martin as  Hutchinson
 Renato Scarpa as  The Accountant
 Sandro Ghiani as  Efisio
 Eddie Tagoe as  Bill
 Elvis Payne as  Tom
 David Burke as  Davis 
 John Woodvine as  The Prosecutor
 Ian Redford as  Buntin
 Patrick O'Connell as Mallory

See also       
 List of Italian films of 1982

References

External links

1982 films
Italian comedy films
1982 comedy films
1980s Italian-language films
English-language Italian films
Comedy films based on actual events
Films directed by Giulio Paradisi
Films set in London
Commedia all'italiana
Films about immigration
Films with screenplays by Age & Scarpelli
1980s Italian films